Miet Filipović (born 17 June 1975) is a retired Croatian taekwondo practitioner. Her international competitive career spanned from 1992 to 2005. Her greatest success was winning gold at the 2004 European Taekwondo Championships.

Sources
 
 

1975 births
Living people
Croatian female taekwondo practitioners
Taekwondo practitioners at the 1992 Summer Olympics
Olympic taekwondo practitioners of Croatia
Sportspeople from Zagreb
World Taekwondo Championships medalists
European Taekwondo Championships medalists
20th-century Croatian women
21st-century Croatian women